Treva Gene "Bookie" Bolin (born June 17, 1940) is a former American football offensive lineman who played professional in the National Football League (NFL) from 1962 through 1969. He played college football at the University of Mississippi where he was part of the 1960 national championship team, and he attended Okolona High School.

References

1940 births
Living people
American football offensive linemen
Minnesota Vikings players
New York Giants players
Ole Miss Rebels football players
People from Hamilton, Alabama
Players of American football from Alabama